Demba Diagouraga (born March 12, 1978 in Corbeil-Essonnes, Essonne) is a French former professional footballer. He played at professional level in Ligue 2 for AS Nancy, and appeared for many years in the lower divisions for clubs including Red Star Saint-Ouen.

References

External links
 

1978 births
Living people
People from Corbeil-Essonnes
French footballers
Association football forwards
ES Viry-Châtillon players
Gazélec Ajaccio players
AS Nancy Lorraine players
Red Star F.C. players
Sainte-Geneviève Sports players
Aviron Bayonnais FC players
Ligue 2 players
Footballers from Essonne

AS Corbeil-Essonnes (football) players